Uélé Province is a former province of the Democratic Republic of the Congo.
It was formed in 1963 from part of Orientale Province.
In 1966 it was merged back into the reconstituted Orientale Province.
It roughly corresponds to the modern provinces of Bas-Uélé and Haut-Uélé.

Region

The province took its name from the Uélé River.
The Uélé region was once home to assimilating kingdoms (not Bantu), which however left only a scattered settlements.
Bas-Uélé is the domain of the Zande people, and Haut-Uélé the domain of the Mangbetu people.
In recent times, Haut-Uélé has been exploited for gold mining.

Administration

The heads of Uélé Province were:

Notes

Sources

Former provinces of the Democratic Republic of the Congo (pre-1966)